Cancerkin is a charity in the United Kingdom which offers support to breast cancer patients. Founded in 1987, it is based at the Royal Free Hospital in North London.

See also 
 Cancer in the United Kingdom

External links
Official website

Medical and health organisations based in London
Organizations established in 1987
Cancer organisations based in the United Kingdom